Wasting Light World Tour was a concert tour by American rock band Foo Fighters, in support of their seventh studio album Wasting Light. It began on January 28, 2011 at a secret show at Velvet Jones in Santa Barbara, California where they debuted the album in full. The tour included dates across Europe, Oceania, North and South America and included festival dates such as Reading and Leeds Festival as well a series of performances in hardcore fans' garages which was documented in their "Garage Tour" documentary on YouTube.

Background
The tour started with a series of secret intimate shows across California including at The Roxy. They also played at the Shockwaves NME Awards 2011 show at O2 Brixton Academy and was their first performance at the venue since the There Is Nothing Left to Lose tour.

The tour featured a 52 page rider which included a series of jokey requests including a "ban on light sabers, garden gnomes, and tridents at show venues."

Many special guests joined the band on stage during the tour including Roger Daltrey, Lemmy, Phil Campbell, Bob Mould, Roger Taylor, Alice Cooper, Sea Sick Steve, John Paul Jones, Queen, Perry Farrell, Tenacious D, Joan Jett, Krist Novoselic, Fee Waybill, CeeLo Green, Roger Waters, Mick Jagger, Danny Clinch, deadmau5 and Rufus Tiger Taylor.

Songs Performed

Foo Fighters
"Alone + Easy Target"
"Big Me"
"For All The Cows"
"Exhausted"
"I'll Stick Around"
"This Is a Call"
"Wattershed"

The Colour and the Shape
"Enough Space"
"Everlong"
"Hey, Johnny Park!"
"Monkey Wrench"
"My Hero"
"New Way Home"
"See You"
"Up in Arms"

There Is Nothing Left to Lose
"Aurora"
"Breakout"
"Generator"
"Learn to Fly"
"Stacked Actors"

One by One
"All My Life"
"Times Like These"

In Your Honor
"Best of You"
"Cold Day in the Sun"
"DOA"

Echoes, Silence, Patience & Grace
"Let It Die"
"Long Road to Ruin"
"The Pretender"

Greatest Hits
"Wheels"

Wasting Light
"Arlandria"
"Back and Forth"
"Bridge Burning"
"Dear Rosemary"
"I Should Have Known"
"A Matter of Time"
"Miss the Misery"*
"Rope"
"These Days"
"Walk"
"White Limo"

Other (non-album songs)
"Butterflies"
"Skin and Bones"
"Winnebago"

Covers
"19th Nervous Breakdown"  
"Ace of Spades"  
"Back in the Doghouse"  
"Bad Reputation  
"Breakdown" 
"Blackbird" 
"Everybody Wants Some!!" 
"Happy Birthday to You" 
"Hocus Pocus" 
"I Love Rock 'n' Roll" 
"I'm Eighteen" 
"I'm the One" 
"In The Flesh?" 
"It's Only Rock 'n Roll (But I Like It)" 
"School's Out" 
"Shake Your Blood" 
"Surrender" 
"Tie Your Mother Down" 
"Young Man Blues"

Opening acts

Scream – 
Bob Mould – 
CeeLo Green -

Tour dates

Notes

References 

2011 concert tours
2012 concert tours
Foo Fighters concert tours